The 1975–76 Purdue Boilermakers men's basketball team represented Purdue University during the 1975-76 college basketball season.

Schedule

Personnel

Starting Lineup: F Jordan, F Walls, C Scheffler, G Parker, G Macy

References

Purdue Boilermakers
Purdue Boilermakers men's basketball seasons
Purdue Boilermakers men's basketball
Purdue Boilermakers men's basketball